PSFS may refer to:
 Philadelphia Savings Fund Society
 Philadelphia Science Fiction Society